Porphyromonas macacae  is a Gram-negative, non-spore-forming, anaerobic and non-motile bacterium from the genus of Porphyromonas which has been isolated from the periodontal pocket of the macaque Macaca arctoides.

References 

Bacteroidia
Bacteria described in 1980